Brosh (lit. Cypress) is a moshav in southern Israel. Located in the north-western Negev between Ofakim and Netivot, it falls under the jurisdiction of Bnei Shimon Regional Council.

Etymology
The name Brosh is taken from the Book of Isaiah, specifically Isaiah 41:19:
I will plant in the wilderness the cedar, the acacia-tree, and the myrtle, and the oil-tree; I will set in the desert the cypress, the plane-tree, and the larch together;
Two other nearby moshavim, Tidhar (plane-tree) and Ta'ashur (larch) take their name from this passage and the three of them are known as the Moshavei Yahdav (lit. the "Together Moshavim").

History
The moshav was established in 1953, with Moroccan immigrants making up most of the founders. It houses a service centre serving all three moshavim, including a library, an after-school child care centre, a club for the elderly and a medical clinic.

Notable residents
Nirit Bakshi, Miss Israel 2000

References

External links
Brosh Negev Information Centre

Moshavim
Populated places established in 1953
Populated places in Southern District (Israel)
1953 establishments in Israel
Moroccan-Jewish culture in Israel